Doug Cox may refer to:

Doug Cox (footballer) (1957–2019), Australian rules footballer
Doug Cox (musician) (born 1962/3), Canadian multi-instrumentalist, composer and music programmer
Doug Cox (politician) (born 1952), American politician from Oklahoma
Doug Cox (wrestler) (born 1957), Canadian wrestler who competed at the 1986 Commonwealth Games

See also
Douglas Cox (disambiguation)